Unreal is a first-person shooter video game developed by Epic MegaGames and Digital Extremes and published by GT Interactive for Microsoft Windows in May 1998. It was powered by Unreal Engine, an original game engine. The game reached sales of 1.5 million units by 2002.

Since the release of Unreal, the franchise has had one sequel and two different series based on the Unreal universe. One official bonus pack, the Epic-released Fusion Map Pack, can be downloaded free of charge. Unreal Mission Pack: Return to Na Pali, developed by Legend Entertainment, was released in June 1999, and added 17 new missions to the single-player campaign of Unreal. Unreal and Return to Na Pali would later be bundled together as Unreal Gold. Additionally, the games were updated to run on the Unreal Tournament version of the game engine.

Plot
The player takes on the part of Prisoner 849, aboard the prison spacecraft Vortex Rikers. During transport to a moon-based prison, the ship is pulled to an uncharted planet before reaching its destination. The ship crash-lands on the lip of a canyon on the planet Na Pali, home of the Nali, a primitive tribal race of four-armed humanoids. The Nali and their planet have been subjugated by the Skaarj, a race of brutish yet technologically advanced reptilian humanoids. Skaarj troops board the downed Vortex Rikers and kill the remaining survivors, except for Prisoner 849 who manages to find a weapon and escape from the ship.

The planet Na Pali is rich in "Tarydium", a mineral that is found as light blue crystals, possessing a high energy yield and are the reason the Skaarj have invaded. The ship has crashed near one of the many mines and processing facilities that the Skaarj have built. Prisoner 849 travels through the mines, meeting Nali slaves and eventually entering the ruins of Nali temples, villages and cities, where the extent of the Nalis' suffering and exploitation are made clear.

Throughout the game the player stumbles across the remains of other humans, often with electronic journals that detail their last days and hint at the cause of their demise. Usually the tales are of desperate struggles to hide from the Skaarj or other bloodthirsty inhabitants of the planet. The player never meets another live human aside from a wounded crew member on the bridge of the prison ship who gasps and dies immediately. Prisoner 849 is likely the only human alive on the planet Na Pali throughout the game.

Prisoner 849 continues to make his way through a series of alien installations, a second crashed human spaceship, and ancient Nali temples infested with Skaarj troops and their minions, eventually arriving at the Nali Castle. Inside the castle, the prisoner locates a teleporter that leads to the Skaarj Mothership. The mothership proves to be a vast labyrinth, but Prisoner 849 manages to find the ship's reactor and destroys it, plunging the vessel into darkness. After navigating the corridors in the dark, the player arrives at the Skaarj Queen's chamber and kills her. Prisoner 849 jumps into an escape pod as the mothership disintegrates. Although the prisoner survives the Skaarj, the escape pod is left to float into space with slim hopes of being found.

Expansion plot
The expansion, Return to Na Pali, developed by Legend Entertainment, picks up not long after Unreals ending; Prisoner 849 is found by a human warship, the UMS Bodega Bay. The Unified Military Services (UMS) conscripted the prisoner into service upon learning their identity, forcing the prisoner to return to Na Pali in order to locate the downed ship UMS Prometheus.  There, the prisoner is to retrieve some weapons research. In return, the prisoner will receive a full pardon and transportation back to Earth, though the real plan is revealed to be maintaining the secrecy of the mission by killing the prisoner immediately after the information is secured.

Upon arriving at the Prometheus, Prisoner 849 finds the secret weapons log, but soon after, they find a working radio communicator nearby. The prisoner listens to a recently recorded and archived conversation between the Bodega Bay and a nearby space station, the UMS Starlight, exposing the military's treachery. As Prisoner 849 transmits the research log, a squad of marines beam on board Prometheus, intending to eliminate the prisoner who manages to escape into a nearby mine system.

Once again, Prisoner 849 is forced to traverse a series of alien facilities and Nali temples in an attempt to locate another way off the planet. Eventually the prisoner ends up at another Nali Castle, where a small space shuttle is stored. After fighting through Skaarj, the prisoner manages to take off in the spacecraft. However, the Bodega Bay is waiting in orbit, and launches a missile at the prisoner's ship. The prisoner outmaneuvers the missile, and leads it back on a collision course with the Bodega Bay. The large ship is disabled by the ensuing blast, and Prisoner 849 escapes into space. 
Hopefully he made it to earth.

Development
Unreal was jointly developed by Epic MegaGames and Digital Extremes and mostly funded with the proceeds from Epic Pinball, Epic's best selling shareware game. In the February 1997 issue of Next Generation, lead designer James Schmalz recalled how it started:

While the team still had only the outdoor terrain and the dragon in place, Intel invited Epic MegaGames to demonstrate Unreal to them. Following the demonstration, Intel told them about their upcoming MMX instruction set. Sweeney was immediately excited by the possibilities MMX presented, and put together a working MMX version of the rendering code before Epic had even received a chip with MMX.

Originally, Unreal was going to feature a large status bar and centered weapons, similar to Doom and Quake. As development progressed, various levels were cut from development. A few of these levels reappeared in the Return to Na Pali expansion pack. A number of enemies from early versions are present in the released software, but with variations and improvements to their look. One monster that didn't make the cut was a dragon. One of the weapons shown in early screenshots was the "Quadshot" - a four-barreled shotgun; the model remains in-game, while there is no code for the weapon to function (several user-made modifications bring the weapon back in the game). Another weapon shown was a different pistol, however this may have just been an early version of the Automag. At one point, the rifle could fire three shots at once, which is wrongly stated as the alternate fire in the Unreal manual that comes with Unreal Anthology.

Initially the game's player character was to be female, but as the number of games with female playable characters increased, the team decided to allow the player to select from a male character and a female character.

In late 1996 GT Interactive secured exclusive global publishing rights to Unreal.

With the game still in development, Epic MegaGames started work on a port for the Nintendo 64DD. Mark Rein stated in an interview that "We still have to get Nintendo's approval on everything, but we're working on it. We're already coding the engine. ... we'll have to reduce the dimensions of the textures, so they'll be scaled down quite a bit, but with the bi-linear filtering, you can get away with much lower resolution textures and it will look just as good". He added that while a port for the standalone Nintendo 64 would probably be possible, the limited storage space of the cartridge format would necessitate heavy compromises to the details on the monsters and the number of unique textures. A Dreamcast port was also planned, and was in fact demoed for the system's capabilities early on its lifecycle, but was canceled when GT Interactive entered financial struggles (one of the reasons they would be purchased by Infogrames in 1999), and a port of Unreal Tournament would take its place in 2001.

Since Unreal came packaged with its own scripting language called UnrealScript, it soon developed a large community on the Internet which was able to add new mods (short for "modifications") in order to change or enhance gameplay. This feature greatly added to the overall longevity of the product and provided an incentive for new development. A map editor and overall complete modification program called UnrealEd also came with the package.

Unreals method of creating maps differs in major ways from that of Quake. The bundled UnrealEd map editor uses the Unreal engine to render scenes exactly as they appear in-game, as opposed to external editors like Worldcraft attempting to recreate it with different methods. Whereas Quake maps are compiled from a variety of different components, Unreal maps are inherently editable on the fly. This allows anybody to edit any map that is created, including the maps included with the game.

Graphics
The Unreal engine brought a host of graphical improvements. Unreals software renderer allowed software features as rich as the hardware renderers of the time, including colored lighting and even a limited form of texture filtering referred to by Sweeney as an ordered "texture coordinate space" dither. Early pre-release versions of Unreal were based entirely on software rendering.

Unreal was one of the first games to utilize detail texturing. This type of multiple texturing enhances the surfaces of objects with a second texture that shows material detail. When the player stands within a small distance from most surfaces, the detail texture will fade in and make the surface appear much more complex (high-resolution) instead of becoming increasingly blurry. Notable surfaces with these special detail textures included computer monitors, pitted metal surfaces aboard the prison ship, golden metal doors, and stone surfaces within Nali temples. This extra texture layer was not applied to character models. The resulting simulation of material detail on game objects was intended to aid the player's suspension of disbelief. For many years after Unreals release (and Unreal Tournaments release), detail texturing only worked well with the S3 MeTaL and Glide renderer. It was, in fact, disabled in the Direct3D renderer by default (but could be re-enabled in the Unreal.ini file) due to performance and quality issues caused by the driver, while it was present even on hardware many times more powerful than the original S3 Savage3D and 3Dfx Voodoo Graphics.

Because of Unreals long development time, the course of development occurred during the emergence and rapid progression of hardware 3D accelerators. Along with the advanced software 3D renderer, Unreal was built to take advantage of the 3Dfx Glide API, which emerged as the dominant interface towards the end of the game's development. When Unreal was finally released, Microsoft's Direct3D API was growing rapidly in popularity and Epic was fairly quick to develop a renderer for their game engine. However, the Direct3D renderer, released initially to support the new Matrox G200, was less capable and slower than the Glide support, especially in the beginning when it was unstable, slow, and had many graphics quality issues. Unreal also had official OpenGL support.

Audio

While many game companies went from FM synthesis or General MIDI in the early 1990s to enhanced CD audio and pre-rendered audio, many of the Epic Games used the less common system of module music, composed with a tracker, which used stored PCM sound samples of musical instruments sequenced together to produce music. Epic had been using this technology for other games such as Jazz Jackrabbit and One Must Fall: 2097, which allowed relatively rich music to be stored in files usually smaller than one megabyte. This technology allowed easy implementation of dynamic music for mood changes in Unreal. The Unreal soundtrack was written by MOD music authors Alexander Brandon and Michiel van den Bos with a few selected tracks by Dan Gardopée and Andrew Sega. Unreals music engine also supports CD audio tracks. The game also made use of the Aureal 3D technology.

Community patch support
In July 2000 the official support ended with patch 2.26f by Epic MegaGames. Therefore, with the awareness and permission of Epic, the fan community started the OldUnreal Community patch project based on the original source code in 2008. The latest patch iteration, 2.27i, released in November 2012, features new graphics rendering like DirectX 9, updated OpenGL, new sound rendering based on OpenAL and fixes many incompatibilities with modern operating systems and hardware.

Mac OS
The Mac version was released in parallel with the PC version. It supported RAVE hardware acceleration as well as 3DFX's Voodoo, built-in software rendering and, later on, OpenGL rendering. RAVE acceleration support allowed the game to support hardware 3D acceleration with just about every Mac that included it. It also supported Apple's Game Sprockets.

The last update for the Mac OS port was version 224b, which breaks network compatibility between it and the PC version, as well as lacking support for some user-created content made for 225 and 226f. Westlake Interactive, the company responsible for the port, claimed that previous patches were produced voluntarily in their free time, beyond their contractual obligations. They also stated that they did not receive the code for the 225 patch and that it had become unavailable due to Epic moving on to develop version 226.

Linux
An unofficial content port of the single-player maps to Linux was created by several users of icculus.org, which allowed the Unreal single-player game content to be run as a modification for Unreal Tournament. The online retailer Tux Games at one point sold a box set including the Linux version. The 227 community patch contains a full Linux port for Unreal.

Books
Two novels titled Hard Crash and Prophet's Power were published, expanding on the premise and story first introduced in Unreal. Prophet's Power, numbered as the second book in the series, is actually a prequel to the first, Hard Crash; thus it is harder for readers to understand what happened in the story. A book called Escape to Na Pali: A Journey to the Unreal was published on June 23, 2014. It is an adventure to the world of Unreal, written by Kaitlin Tremblay and Alan Williamson.

Reception

Sales
In the United States, Unreal debuted in third place on PC Data's computer game sales chart for the week ending May 23, 1998, at an average retail price (ARP) of $50. It climbed to first place the following week, while its ARP dropped to $40. Finishing May as the country's second-highest computer game seller of the month, behind StarCraft, Unreal proceeded to alternate with StarCraft between positions 1 and 2 on the weekly charts through the May 31 – June 27 period. Jason Ocampo of Computer Games Strategy Plus characterized the games' competition for first place as a "tug-of-war". Unreal ultimately held at #2 behind StarCraft on the monthly chart for June as a whole, and became the United States' 15th-best-selling computer game of 1998's first half.

Unreal maintained a position in PC Data's weekly top 10 from June 28 through August 1. It continued its streak at second place for July overall, and totaled sales in excess of 120,000 copies in the United States by the end of that month, according to PC Data. IGN described this performance as "a huge hit". In early August, GT Interactive reported that global sales of Unreal had topped 500,000 copies, which contributed to growth at the publisher. The game went on to appear in PC Data's weekly top 10 from August 2 through the week ending September 12, when it fell to #10, and in the monthly top 10 for both August and September. After falling to 19th place for October in total, it exited the monthly top 20. Ultimately, PC Data declared Unreal the United States' 11th-best-selling computer game during the January–November 1998 period.

In the United States, Unreal finished 1998 as the year's 13th-biggest computer game seller, with sales of 291,300 units and revenues of $10.96 million. Its ARP for the year was $38. According to GameDaily, the game's sales in the United States reached 350,000 units by January 1999. Worldwide sales surpassed one million units by September 1999, and reached 1.5 million copies by November 2002.

Critical response

Unreal was very well received upon release. Critics praised the graphics, gameplay, music, atmosphere, enemy behavior, and bot support in multiplayer, but criticized the lag-ridden online multiplayer.

Macworlds Michael Gowan wrote: "This 3-D shoot-'em-up reinvigorates a tired genre. Plot, atmosphere, and exploration mix with ferocious enemies to make this game stand out from the pack".

Next Generation reviewed the PC version of the game, rating it five stars out of five, and stated that "Unreal is the single best action game ever to appear on PC".

Accolades
In 1998, PC Gamer US declared Unreal the 13th-best computer game ever released.

Further reading

Notes

References

External links
www.unreal.com Official Webpage (archived by Archive.org on March 31, 2001)

1998 video games
Cancelled 64DD games
Cancelled Dreamcast games
Cooperative video games
Epic Games games
First-person shooters
GT Interactive games
Linux games
Classic Mac OS games
Multiplayer and single-player video games
Science fiction video games
Unreal (video game series)
Video games about extraterrestrial life
Video games developed in Canada
Video games developed in the United States
Video games featuring protagonists of selectable gender
Video games scored by Andrew Sega
Video games scored by Dan Gardopée
Video games scored by Michiel van den Bos
Video games set in castles
Video games set on fictional planets
Video games with expansion packs
Video games with user-generated gameplay content
Unreal Engine games
Windows games
Westlake Interactive games